The University Institute of Engineering & Technology (UIET) was established by Kurukshetra University in 2004 in the state of Haryana. It is a government college situated in University campus of Kurukshetra University.

The institute is headed by Prof. C.C. Tripathi, Director. The institute was started with the help of the World Bank and functions as a self-financed college.

Departments
The institute comprises the following departments:
 Computer Science & Engineering Department
 Electronics & Communication Engineering Department
 Mechanical Engineering Department
 Biotechnology Engineering Department

References

External links
Official website

All India Council for Technical Education
Engineering colleges in Haryana
Kurukshetra University
Kurukshetra
Educational institutions established in 2004
2004 establishments in Haryana